Erich Isselhorst (5 February 1906 – 23 February 1948) was a German war criminal and Schutzstaffel (SS) member before and during World War II.

Between 1942 and 1943, during the German invasion of the Soviet Union, Isselhorst was an Einsatzkommando leader, tasked with the murdering of Jews in what is now Belarus and the Baltic states. Before and after, Isselhorst held posts within the Gestapo and SS in Cologne, Munich, Stuttgart and Strasbourg.

He was sentenced to death by both a British and French military court and executed in France in 1948 for ordering the execution of captured British SAS members and French civilians in 1944.

Biography

Early life
Erich Georg Heinrich Isselhorst was born in Saint-Avold, Lorraine, in 1906, which was then part of the German Empire but is now part of France. He was educated in Dortmund, Recklinghausen and Düsseldorf, where he graduated in 1925. He was employed in a rubber factory before studying law from 1927 to 1930 in Cologne and Munich. Isselhorst received his doctoral degree in law in 1931, once more returned to Düsseldorf, and joined the Nazi Party in August 1932.

SS career
Isselhorst joined the Sturmabteilung (SA), in May 1933, and the SS in October 1934. He was admitted to the Sicherheitsdienst (SD) in July 1937 and permanently employed in the Gestapo in Berlin from December 1935, forward. From February 1936 to April 1938 he was head of the Gestapo in Cologne, after which he was transferred to Klagenfurt, Austria, which had recently been annexed by Nazi Germany. During this time, he also served as a reservist in the Wehrmacht, taking part in training with an anti-aircraft regiment.

From December 1939 to November 1942, Isselhorst served as the head of the Gestapo in Munich. In January 1942 he was severely reprimanded for behaviour unbecoming of a member of the SS.

From January to October 1942, Isselhorst was transferred to the Reichskommissariat Ostland in occupied Belarus, where he headed a department of the Sicherheitspolizei (SiPo; Security Police). In September and October 1942 he led Einsatzkommando 8, a sub-group of the mobile killing unit known as Einsatzgruppe B, which was tasked with murdering Jews. From October 1942 to June 1943 he led Einsatzkommando 1 of the Einsatzgruppe A, now in the Baltic states, carrying out the murder of Jews there. From June to October 1943 he was head of the SiPo in Minsk while also leading Sonderkommandos 1b of the Einsatzgruppe A.

Isselhorst returned to Germany in October 1943 and his old role in Munich before being transferred to Strasbourg in December, where he headed the SiPo there. At the same time he also headed the SiPo in Stuttgart.

Murder of captured SAS soldiers
While posted in Strasbourg in the second half of 1944, Isselhorst was part of the Operation Waldfest, a scorched earth operation in which villages in the Vosges mountains were destroyed to eliminate shelter for Allied troops for the upcoming winter, with the inhabitants deported as forced labour or to Nazi concentration camps. In a coordinated operation by the Wehrmacht and SS, villages were raided. There Maquis French resistance fighters, and 39 British paratroopers of the Special Air Service, part of the Operation Loyton were executed; the latter as part of Hitler's Commando Order.

Isselhorst ordered the execution of the captured British SAS members, as well as a number of French civilians, three French priests and four US airmen. The prisoners were taken over the Rhine river on trucks to Gaggenau on 21 November 1944. The leader of the execution commando, Karl Buck (reported as Karl Buck in "The Nazi Hunters" - Damien Lewis - 2015), thought it unwise to leave mass graves of shot allied soldiers in an area so close to the front line. The prisoners were initially kept in a local jail, but then on or shortly after 25 November, taken to a local forest and shot in the head in a bomb crater. One prisoner attempted to escape, but was killed. Apart from Isselhorst, his second in command, Wilhelm Schneider was also executed for the war crime in January 1947. Buck was sentenced to death, but was reprieved and released in 1954.

In January 1945 Isselhorst was transferred once more, now to the Reich Security Main Office (RSHA) in Berlin, where he remained until April. Isselhorst was arrested by US forces on 12 May 1945 in southern Bavaria.

Execution
Isselhorst was sentenced to death by a British military court in June 1946 for the murder of British POWs, but handed over to the French. He was sentenced to death once more in May 1947, now by a French military tribunal, and executed in Strasbourg on 23 February 1948.

References

Bibliography

External links
 

1906 births
1948 deaths
People from Lorraine
Einsatzgruppen personnel
Nazi Party members
People executed by the French Fourth Republic
Nazis executed by firing squad
Nazis executed in France
Holocaust perpetrators in Belarus
Holocaust perpetrators in Lithuania
Nazis convicted of war crimes
Prisoners sentenced to death by the British military
Perpetrators of World War II prisoner of war massacres
Executed mass murderers